Gaston Claudio Corvalán (born 23 March 1989) is an Argentine professional footballer who plays as a left-back for Argentine Primera División side Unión Santa Fe.

Career
Corvalán's senior career started in 2009 with Primera B Nacional club Quilmes, he made his debut on 30 May in a win over Ferro Carril Oeste. He made a further three league appearances in 2008–09 and scored his first goal in his last game of the season against Olimpo. Corvalán made thirty-four appearances in 2009–10 as Quilmes won promotion into the 2010–11 Argentine Primera División. However, the club were relegated and returned to Primera B Nacional for 2011–12. 2011–12 turned out to be his last with Quilmes, but it did end in promotion as the team again finished second in Primera B Nacional.

As Quilmes made their way into the Argentine Primera División, Corvalán followed as he left to join Racing Club. He went onto make fifty-one appearances over two seasons for Racing Club before being loaned out to Newell's Old Boys and then to Arsenal de Sarandí, both Primera División clubs. He played eleven times for Newell's and twenty for Arsenal, at the end of his loan spell with Arsenal the club signed him permanently. In his first match since signing permanently, Corvalán was sent off in a defeat to Sarmiento. He made his 200th league appearance on 16 October versus San Martín.

In June 2018, following Arsenal's relegation to Primera B Nacional, Corvalán departed to sign for Unión Santa Fe.

Career statistics
.

References

External links

1989 births
Living people
People from Quilmes
Argentine footballers
Association football defenders
Primera Nacional players
Argentine Primera División players
Quilmes Atlético Club footballers
Racing Club de Avellaneda footballers
Newell's Old Boys footballers
Arsenal de Sarandí footballers
Unión de Santa Fe footballers
Sportspeople from Buenos Aires Province